The Northolme (known as the Gainsborough Martin & Co. Arena for sponsorship purposes) is a football ground in Gainsborough, Lincolnshire, England. It is the home ground of Gainsborough Trinity, it has a capacity of 4,304, of which 504 is seated.

History
The Northolme was opened in the 1850s, and was originally used as a cricket ground. Gainsborough Trinity moved to the ground in 1884, at which time the only spectator facility was a small covered stand in the south-west corner of the ground. Players used the nearby Sun Inn for changing rooms, with the pub building a special extension for use by the football club.

A 200-seat grandstand was later added along the southern touchline, along with a covered terrace on the northern side of the pitch. Trinity were elected to the Football League in 1896, and the first League match at the ground was played on 12 September 1896, with 2,000 spectators watching a 1–1 draw with Manchester City. The ground was still used for cricket, and Trinity occasionally had to play matches at the Bowling Green Ground in the north-west of the town and Sincil Bank in Lincoln. The record attendance for a Football League match at the Northolme was set on 29 April 1911, when 5,600 saw Trinity beat Chelsea 3–1.

Gainsborough were voted out of the Football League at the end of the 1911–12 season, and returned to the Midland League. The ground's record attendance of 9,760 was set for a Midland League match against local rivals Scunthorpe United in the 1940s. During the same decade the stand on the southern touchline burnt down and a new grandstand was built on the northern touchline.

In 1988 Worksop Town lost their Central Avenue ground, and were forced to groundshare at the Northolme until 1992. A similar request was rejected in 2008.

For the beginning of the 2020–21 season, rivals Boston United were granted permission to use the Northolme as their home ground temporarily whilst finishing touches were applied to their new stadium.

References

External links

Football venues in England
Sports venues in Lincolnshire
Worksop Town F.C.
Cricket grounds in Lincolnshire
Defunct cricket grounds in England
Gainsborough Trinity F.C.
English Football League venues
Gainsborough, Lincolnshire
Boston United F.C.